In 1994 the Atlanta Housing Authority, encouraged by the federal HOPE VI program, embarked on a policy created for the purpose of comprehensive revitalization of severely distressed public housing developments. These distressed public housing properties were replaced by mixed-income communities.

Replaced by mixed-income communities

Capitol Homes
Capitol Homes was completed on April 7, 1942, designed to serve black families in low-rise housing. The six hundred ninety-four units demolished were replaced by Capitol Gateway, which includes 1,000 units of housing for various income levels.

Carver Homes
The George Washington Carver Homes project in southeast Atlanta was finished on February 17, 1953, costing $8.6 million and consisting of 990 units for African-Americans. The project was located near Joyland, an amusement park for black Atlantans. The project was demolished and was partially replaced with the Villages at Carver. It is currently undergoing further revitalization by the AHA.

Eagan Homes
John Eagan Homes was a 677-unit complex built in 1941 for black families. It cost $2 million to build and was located in Vine City. The complex was torn down in the 2000s and replaced by Magnolia Park.

East Lake Meadows
The East Lake Meadows project, 654 units built in 1971, was one of the most infamous of all of Atlanta's public housing. At the time the nation's largest turnkey project, East Lake Meadows was immediately plagued by maintenance problems due to poor construction. Crime rates soared, and reporter Bill Seldon for the Atlanta Constitution highlighted the project in a series of articles comparing the high number of killings in Atlanta to Vietnam. These articles led to East Lake Meadows gaining the nickname of "Little Vietnam", and helped contribute to the turning of public opinion against public housing.

In the 1990s, as part of his efforts to revitalize the East Lake neighborhood, developer and philanthropist Tom Cousins began working with the AHA to replace East Lake Meadows with a mixed-income community. This took place in a larger context of tearing down Atlanta's public housing. In addition to mixed-income housing units, the redevelopment plan included an education center, a private golf course, and various local amenities. Over the course of ten years, East Lake Meadows was demolished and replaced with The Villages at East Lake, the total project costing $172 million.

Grady Homes
Completed in 1942, Grady Homes originally contained 495 units for black families. Located in the Sweet Auburn neighborhood, it was demolished and replaced with the Auburn Pointe mixed-income community.

Harris Homes
Built in 1957, this 510 unit housing site was created to mark the racial divide between white and black Atlanta. However, its proximity to an African-American neighborhood meant few whites chose to live there, and it was mostly vacant until desegregation. It was replaced by Ashley Collegetown. The adjacent John O. Chiles Senior Residence Building was renovated.

John Hope Homes
Built adjacent to University Homes in 1941, John Hope Homes 606 units was originally built for black families. In the 2000s, it was demolished and replaced with The Villages at Castleberry Hill.

McDaniel-Glenn Homes
The McDaniel-Glenn housing project was built in 1967, with the Martin Luther King Memorial Building (a highrise for the elderly) constructed in 1970. Making the complex peak at 768 units Part of the Mechanicsville neighborhood, the complex was demolished in 2006. By 2007, Columbia Residential had completed their redevelopment of the property, named Columbia at Mechanicsville Station. The Martin Luther King High-Rise was demolished with explosives on February 14, 2010.

Perry Homes
Perry Homes was completed in 1954 with 1,100 units for black families. Part of the project was destroyed by a tornado on March 24, 1975, with the buildings being replaced in 1976–77. The project's demolition was completed in 1999, and it was replaced with the West Highlands development. In addition to mixed-income housing, it includes various other amenities such as a YMCA.

Techwood/Clark Howell

Techwood Homes was the first federally funded public housing project in the United States, with 1,230 units opening in 1936. Located in the Centennial Hill district of Downtown Atlanta, it was joined by Clark Howell Homes (both all white) in 1940. In the run-up to the 1996 Olympics, Techwood and Clark Howell Homes were demolished and replaced by Centennial Place.

University Homes
Built in 1938 on the site of the former Beaver Slide slum. Seen as the African American counterpart to Techwood Homes - the first public housing project in the nation. Architect William Augustus Edwards.  Residents of the deteriorating community were relocated in 2006, with 500 units being demolition in 2009. In September 2015, the US Department of Housing and Urban Development (HUD) awarded a Choice Neighborhoods Implementation Grant to revitalize the former University Homes public housing site, along with the Atlanta University Center, Ashview Heights, and the Vine City neighborhoods. The "University Choice Neighborhood" housing plan renamed University Homes to "Scholars Landing." Construction will be complete in 2023.

Demolished (Vacant Land)

Antoine Graves

Senior citizen highrise built 1965. Architect John C. Portman, Jr. who designed numerous high-rises in Downtown Atlanta (AmericasMart, Peachtree Center, Hyatt Regency Atlanta, etc.) One of Portman's earliest and most influential projects, his first atrium building and only public housing project. Located at 126 SE Hilliard St. SE, Downtown. Demolished 2009 including annex. Portman pleaded to save the building to no avail.

Bankhead Courts

Built 1970, consisted of 550 housing units. As of January 2011, "demolition was underway".

Bowen Homes
Bowen Homes was built in 1964, named after John W. E. Bowen, Sr. and was a sprawling complex of red, yellow, green, and blue-colored duplexes, containing an elementary school and a library. They were located along Donald Lee Hollowell Parkway (originally Bankhead Highway) just inside I-285 (the "Perimeter"). The site is now classified as part of the neighborhood of Brookview Heights.

In 1980, a water tube boiler explosion at the onsite Gate City Day Care Center killed four children and a teacher and injured seven others. The residents of Bowen Homes thought the deaths were related to the Atlanta child killings of the late 1970s to early 1980s but it turned out to be a faulty water tube overheating.

A furnace exploded on June 4, 2007, with no fatalities and one injury. The explosion caused damage to the interior of the building.

A.D. Williams Elementary School is still standing to this day.

Rapper Shawty Lo was raised in Bowen Homes (one of his mixtapes Bowen Homes Carlos, is dedicated to the project), and the project was also featured in rapper T.I.'s video What Up, What's Haapnin' (seen as a "diss" to Shawty).  Other musical groups from Bowen Homes include Shop Boyz and Hood Rock. Boxer Evander Holyfield grew up in Bowen.

Bowen Homes was rife with crime—police reports show 168 violent crimes, including five murders, in the half year between June 2007 and January 2008. In 2008, 913 residents had to leave the complex of 104 buildings, which contained 650 units. Bowen Homes was the last large family housing project left in Atlanta and its razing made Atlanta the first major city in America to completely do away with its large family housing projects (some senior and other minor properties remained). Bowen Homes were finally demolished on June 3, 2009.

Englewood Manor
Built in 1970, 324 units of Englewood manor were demolished 2009 by the Atlanta Housing Authority and the land still sits empty to this day. Since 1970, this property has been and still is under the control of the Atlanta Housing Authority.

Gilbert Gardens 
Built in the 1960s torn down in 2004. A.K.A "Poole Creek" the 226 unit housing projects were torn down and families were displaced.

Herndon Homes

Herndon Homes was completed in 1941, containing 520 units for African Americans. It was demolished in 2010. The project was named for Alonzo F. Herndon, who was born a slave, and through founding the Atlanta Life Insurance Company became Atlanta's richest African American.  Herndon Homes was a filming location for the motion picture The Lottery Ticket.

On June 15, 2016, Atlanta Housing Authority announced a development team has been selected to create a mixed-use mixed-income community on the site, "Herndon Square". The first of five phases began construction in January 2020, and is scheduled to complete in Spring 2021.

Hollywood Courts
As of January 2011, the 202 public housing units "demolition was almost complete".

Jonesboro North
145 units torn down in 2008.

Jonesboro South
160 units Torn down in 2008. video
Rapper Young Thug was raised in Jonesboro South Apartments

Leila Valley
225 units Torn down in 2008.

Palmer House
Senior citizen highrise. Named for Charles Forrest Palmer, first president of the Atlanta Housing Authority. Demolished floor-by-floor during Spring 2011.

Roosevelt House
Senior citizen highrise with 150 apartments located at the southwest corner of Centennial Olympic Park Drive and North Avenue. Built 1973. Named for Franklin Delano Roosevelt, the American president who with Atlanta developer Charles Forrest Palmer founded the national public housing policy. Contained 150 apartments. The last residents left in 2009. Demolished with explosives on February 27, 2011.

Thomasville Heights Projects
Built 1967, 350 units demolished 2010.

U-Rescue Villa

Torn down in May 2008.

Section 8 communities

The View at Rosa Burney 

The 288 apartment units once a part of the Mc Daniel Glenn housing project were cleaned up and turned into a section 8 apartment complex.

The Element at Kirkwood Apartments 

The apartment units once were a part of the Eastlake Meadows housing project but the Atlanta Housing Authority decided to keep the units and turn them into Section 8 housing.

Edgewood Court
The Edgewood Court housing project, built in 1950, is a Section 8 housing project with 204 available units.

Forest Cove
Is a Section 8 community that gets 404 public housing subsidies from the Atlanta Housing Authority.

Not Demolished

Martin Street Plaza
Martin Street Plaza, in Summerhill, also known as the Summerhill Projects, built in 1979 continue operating today.

Westminster
Westminster is a 32 unit public housing community in Atlanta, Georgia.

East Lake Highrise
East Lake Highrise is a 150 unit affordable housing community in Atlanta, East Lake Highrise is owned and managed by the Atlanta Housing Authority also is the last remaining structure of the East lake meadows housing project.

Cosby Spear Highrise
Cosby Spear Highrise is a 282 unit affordable housing community in Atlanta, Georgia. The community is located in the 5th Congressional District of Georgia also the last remaining structure of the U-Rescue Villa housing project.

Hillcrest Homes
Hillcrest (demolished)100 units used to be owned by the Atlanta housing Authority but was sold to the East Point Housing Authority and has sat vacant but undemolished after the East Point Housing Authority [EPHA] failed to give out section 8 applications.

Hidden Village Homes
Hidden Village Homes is a 500-unit abandoned housing project once owned by the AHA located 2208 Verbena street, in northwest Atlanta. The complex sits in the Dixie Hill neighborhood. It was abandoned due to fire damage.

John O. Chiles
John O. Chiles (Harris III) is a 190 unit affordable housing community in Atlanta, Georgia. The community is located in the 5th Congressional neighborhood the last remaining structure of Harris Homes.

Tucker Homes
Built in the 1940s (still standing) the housing project was renovated in 2004 and sold as a private development known as (The Station at Richmond Hill)

References

External links
 Atlanta Housing Authority

African-American history in Atlanta
Demolished buildings and structures in Atlanta
Former populated places in Georgia (U.S. state)
Public housing in Atlanta
Urban renewal in Atlanta